

Canadian football news in 1892
The first CRU Dominion Championship game was played between the Montreal Football Club and Osgoode Hall on November 10, 1892. The Manitoba Rugby Football Union was formed in 1892.

Final regular season standings
Note: GP = Games Played, W = Wins, L = Losses, T = Ties, PF = Points For, PA = Points Against, Pts = Points
*Bold text means that they have clinched the playoffs

League Champions

Playoffs

ORFU Semi-Finals

ORFU Final

Dominion Championship

References

 
Canadian Football League seasons